Jack Harte is an Irish short story writer and novelist. He founded the Irish Writers' Union and the Irish Writers Centre.

Background 
Harte was born on 1 September 1944 in Killeenduff, near Easkey in Co. Sligo. At an early age, his family moved to Lanesboro, Co. Longford, where his blacksmith father found work with Bord na Mona. Harte draws on the experience of this uprooting in his novel In the Wake of the Bagger. Later he moved to Dublin where he worked at many jobs, including the civil service and teaching; from 1983-2000, he was principal of Lucan Community College.

Short stories 
Harte has published several critically acclaimed collections of short stories. His first, Murphy in the Underworld (1986), was welcomed by the Sunday Independent as "one of the most important story collections for some time." After publication of his second collection, Birds and Other Tails (1996), the Irish Independent described Harte as "a wonderful refreshing voice in contemporary Irish writing." Both these collections are out of print, although several of their stories are included in From Under Gogol's Nose (2004).

Several short stories and collections have been published in translation. These include Birds and Selected Stories, published in Bulgarian in 2001, Dream of A Pyramid, published in Hindi in 2006, and From Under Gogol's Nose, published in Russian by Voskresenye Publishing House, Moscow, in 2007.

Novels 
Jack Harte's book releases have been reviewed as mediocre in many publications. Harte's first novel, In the Wake of the Bagger, was published in 2006. It was commissioned by Sligo Co Council under the Irish Government's Per Cent for Art scheme. It tells the story of the Dowd family, who are uprooted from their home in Killeenduff and resettle as economic migrants in the Irish Midlands. It describes the tension between the traditional Irish way of life and the new realities of industrialisation in rural Ireland. The novel was described in the Irish Independent as "one of the great books about Ireland." It was selected by Des Kenny as one of his 101 Irish Books You MUST Read – Kenny's Choice.

Harte's second novel is Reflections in a Tar-Barrel.  It weaves the story of Tommy Loftus who sells religious goods in Ireland's west.

Unravelling the Spiral is an account of the life of Harte's cousin, sculptor Fred Conlon. Harte and Conlon were born within ten months of each other in the townland of Killeenduff, grew up together, and were close friends until Conlon's death.

Arts organiser 

Harte was an organiser for the arts in Ireland throughout the 1970s and 1980s. In 1986, Harte founded the Irish Writers' Union. The following year he secured funding from the Irish government to establish the Irish Writers Centre. In December 2008, the Arts Council of Ireland withdrew the Centre's funding because of concerns about "value for money and quality of service to writers". In 2009, the Centre was on the point of closing. Harte was elected chairman and, with the help of other activists, kept the Centre open.

References

Additional references

Dictionary of Literary Biography, Vol 319, British and Irish Short-Fiction Writers (1945–2000).
Dictionary of Irish Literature – Robert Hogan, Aldwich Press, London, 1996.
Mercier Companion to Irish Literature – McMahon and O'Donoghue, Mercier Press, Cork, 1998.
Oxford Concise Companion to Irish Literature – Welch, Oxford University Press, 2000

External links 
 Jack Harte's personal website
 Website of Irish Writers' Union founded by Jack Harte
 Website of the Irish Writers Centre founded by Harte

1944 births
Living people
Irish male short story writers
Irish male novelists